Dunamaise Arts Centre is an arts and cultural centre located in Portlaoise, Ireland, opened in 1999.

History
Maryborough Gaol was built  in a Neoclassical style. It is a seven-bay, two-storey building over a concealed basement with a three-bay central breakfront, built of limestone and Portland stone.

It was renovated in the 1990s, and opened in 1999 as Dunamaise Arts Centre, named for the nearby Rock of Dunamase, a medieval fortress.

Facilities
There is also an exhibition gallery, restaurant and workshop spaces.

References

Theatres in County Laois
Defunct prisons in the Republic of Ireland
Buildings and structures in Portlaoise
1999 establishments in Ireland